The Girl with Something Extra is an American fantasy sitcom television series that aired on NBC for one season during 1973–1974. The series was created by Bernard Slade and produced by Screen Gems.

Synopsis
The Girl with Something Extra is a comedy about the relationship between a normal man and a wife who has a paranormal power: newly married couple John Burton (played by John Davidson) and Sally Burton (played by Sally Field), and their misadventures after John discovers that Sally has ESP.  This ability allows her to read other people's minds. Co-starring in the series were Teri Garr, Jack Sheldon as John's brother Jerry, Henry Jones and Zohra Lampert. Despite airing right after the popular  Sanford and Son Friday nights on NBC, the show failed to find an audience and was canceled at the end of the season due to low ratings. A total of 22 half-hour episodes of the series were produced. The show ranked 59th out of 80 shows that season, with a 15.2 rating.

Cast
 Sally Field as Sally Burton
 John Davidson as John Burton
 Jack Sheldon as Jerry Burton
 Zohra Lampert as Anne
 Stephanie Edwards as Angela 
 Henry Jones as Owen Metcalf
 Teri Garr as Amber
 William Windom as Stuart Kline

Episodes

Award nominations

References

External links 
 
 

1973 American television series debuts
1974 American television series endings
1970s American sitcoms
English-language television shows
American fantasy television series
Fantasy comedy television series
NBC original programming
Television shows about psychic powers
Television series about marriage
Television series by Sony Pictures Television
Television series by Screen Gems
Television shows set in Los Angeles